Kilian Pruschke (born 8 September 1992) is a German professional footballer who plays as a goalkeeper for CFC Hertha 06.

Career
Pruschke was born in Berlin. In November 2013, he joined Tennis Borussia Berlin after his contract with 1. FC Union Berlin had expired at the end of June 2013.

References

External links 
 

1992 births
Living people
Footballers from Berlin
German footballers
Association football goalkeepers
2. Bundesliga players
1. FC Union Berlin players
Tennis Borussia Berlin players